Sir James Ramsden (25 February 1822 – 19 October 1896) was a British mechanical engineer, industrialist, and civic leader, who played a dominant role in the development of the new town of Barrow-in-Furness, in the historic county of Lancashire.  He served five successive terms as mayor on its first achieving municipal borough status, from 1867 onwards.

Biography
James Ramsden was most probably born at Bolton, Lancashire (although the census records are inconsistent on this point).  James Ramsden was one of several children of William Ramsden, an engineer. He served an apprenticeship with the Liverpool firm of Bury, Curtis, and Kennedy before becoming locomotive superintendent for the new Furness Railway Company in January 1846. He very soon rose to become company secretary, and later served as managing director between 1866 and 1895.

In 1866, Ramsden was also appointed managing director of the Barrow Hematite Steel Company, Limited, and from 1875 to 1888 took the same role at The Barrow Shipbuilding Company.

Ramsden's home was Abbots Wood, a large new mansion on the outskirts of the town, rented from the railway company.  From here, he took an active interest in virtually all local developments, including the early Barrow Shipbuilding Company; the new Port of Barrow, and the massively expanded iron and steel industries.  He was also a notable benefactor, contributing towards many new social and civic facilities within the town.

Ramsden was knighted in 1872, and a statue by Matthew Noble was unveiled that same year in what was to become Ramsden Square, Barrow-in-Furness.  A portrait of Ramsden hangs in the borough's town hall. However, he remained a largely local figure, declining calls to stand for Parliament in 1885 when the borough was seeking its first Member of Parliament. He served as High Sheriff of Lancashire from 1873-1874.

Ramsden was married in 1853 to Hannah Mary Edwards from Wallasey, Cheshire.  Their only child Frederic James Ramsden (1859–1941) also served as superintendent of the Furness Railway.

Sir James Ramsden died in 1896 and was buried at Barrow Cemetery.

Notes and references
Notes

References

Ramsden, James
Ramsden, James
Ramsden, James
People from Barrow-in-Furness
Furness
History of Barrow-in-Furness
Knights Bachelor
High Sheriffs of Lancashire